"Which Side Are You On?" is a song written in 1931 by activist Florence Reece, who was the wife of Sam Reece, a union organizer for the United Mine Workers in Harlan County, Kentucky.

Background
In 1931, the miners and the mine owners in southeastern Kentucky were locked in a bitter and violent struggle called the Harlan County War. In an attempt to intimidate the family of union leader Sam Reece, Sheriff J. H. Blair and his men, hired by the mining company, illegally entered their home in search of Reece. Reece had been warned and escaped but his wife, Florence, and their children were terrorized. That night, after the men had gone, Florence wrote the lyrics to "Which Side Are You On?" on a calendar that hung in their kitchen. She took the melody from a traditional Baptist hymn, "Lay the Lily Low", or the traditional ballad "Jack Munro".

Reece supported a second wave of miner strikes circa 1973, as recounted in the documentary Harlan County USA. She and others performed "Which Side Are You On?" a number of times throughout. Reece recorded the song later in life, and it can be heard on the album Coal Mining Women.

Pete Seeger, collecting labor union songs, learned "Which Side Are You On" in 1940. The following year, it was recorded by the Almanac Singers in a version that gained a wide audience. More recently, Billy Bragg, Deacon Blue, Dropkick Murphys, Rebel Diaz, Natalie Merchant, Ani DiFranco, Tom Morello, Panopticon, and S.G. Goodman each recorded their own interpretations of the song.

The song is referred to by Bob Dylan in the song "Desolation Row". It was also the inspiration for the title of Alessandro Portelli's 2011 book on Harlan County's coal mining community.

Versions by other artists
 The Almanac Singers – Talking Union, in 1941.
 The Weavers - "The Weaver's Almanac", in 1963.
 Pete Seeger – "Greatest Hits", in 1967.
 Spirituál kvintet – Za svou pravdou stát (Stand Behind Your Truth), translation to Czech language, in "Dostavník 18", 1983
 Billy Bragg – Between the Wars, in 1985.
 Dick Gaughan – True and Bold, in 1985.
 Bob Bovee - Rebel Voices, in 1988.
 The Savage Rose - Hvis Side Er Du På, in 1989, in Danish.
  – Na čí, in 1991, in Czech
 Deacon Blue – Riches & More, in 1997.
 Ella Jenkins – Ella Jenkins and a Union of Friends Pulling Together, in 1999.
 Blue Highway – Still Climbing Mountains, in 2001.
 Dropkick Murphys – Sing Loud, Sing Proud!, in 2001, and, subsequently Live on St. Patrick's Day from Boston, MA, in 2002.
 Anne Feeney – Union Maid, in 2003.
 Peter, Paul and Mary – 2003
 Natalie Merchant – The House Carpenter's Daughter, in 2003.
 Silas House – Songs for the Mountaintop, in 2006, and Public Outcry, in 2008.
 The Nightwatchman – "Union Town", in 2011.
 Ani DiFranco – ¿Which Side Are You On?, in 2012.
 Panopticon – "Kentucky", in 2012.
 Talib Kweli – "", in 2015.
 The Trigger Code - "Black Mountain White Lake Vol. 1", in 2019
 S.G. Goodman - "Which Side Are You On?", in 2020.
 Birds on a Wire - "Ramages", in 2020.
 Linqua Franqa - "Wurk", in 2022.

Other versions 
 Rebel Diaz made a remix of the song
 Billy Bragg – Back to Basics, in 1987, albeit with different lyrics altogether. This referred to the British miners' strike of 1984–85.
 Frederic Rzewski
 Christian Wolff in String Quartet Exercises Out of Songs (1974)
 B. Dolan – sampled the Almanac Singers in his 2012 version on the album House of Bees Vol. 2
 Hugh Blumenfeld has been performing a medley of "Which Side Are You On?", updated with modernized lyrics, and This Land is Your Land.
 In response to the fatal shooting of Michael Brown protesters briefly interrupted a performance of the St. Louis Symphony Orchestra with the Requiem for Mike Brown, which began as "Which Side Are You On?"
 Talib Kweli in "Which Side Are You On" (featuring Tef Poe & Kendra Ross), sampled with the "Requiem for Mike Brown" (documentary video)).
 Arlo Guthrie recorded "Which Side Are You On" on Outlasting the Blues in 1979. The chorus and melody were similar, but the verses had more of a Biblical / Gospel meaning.
 Civil Rights Movement activists adapted their own version.
 Elvis Costello & Joan Baez On Another Day Another Time, Celebrating The Music of 'Inside Llewyn Davis'
Sarah Lee Guthrie, daughter of Arlo Guthrie and granddaughter of Woody Guthrie, performed a version of the song with new lyrics at a Bernie Sanders rally in 2020.
The words and melody of the refrain were the basis of the song, "Sag mir wo du stehst," one of the most well-known songs of the GDR's song movement of the late 1960s. It was recorded by Oktoberklub.
Megan Slankard remixed the song in 2020 keeping the chorus but changing the verses to be related to candidate Bernie Sanders.

Appearances

In other media
 Director Ken Loach used the title for his 1984 documentary on the music and poetry written about the miners' strike in Britain of that year.
 Which Side is a political podcast that took its name from the title of this song.
 Alessandro Portelli's book They Say in Harlan County: An Oral History (Oxford University Press, 2010) takes its title from a line of the song. Another book by John W. Hevener, Which Side Are You On? The Harlan County Coal Miners, 1931–39 (University of Illinois Press, 2002) is also titled after the song.
 Get Up, Stand Up: The Story of Pop and Protest part 1, 2003 documentary.
 The song plays during the end credits of the 2016 drama In Dubious Battle.
 The song, Florence Reece, and the Harlan miner's strike feature in episode 2 of Damnation.
 The song plays at the end of episode 6 of the HBO series Succession, also entitled "Which Side Are You On?".
 In 2018, "Which side are you on?", along with "The whole world is watching", was written on a large poster held so as to protect, by blocking the view, protestors tearing down the statue of Silent Sam, a Confederate monument, at the University of North Carolina at Chapel Hill.
 The song played in an advert for former U.S President candidate Bernie Sanders during the 2020 Democratic Primaries.

References

External links
"History of American Protest Music: Which Side Are You On?" from Longreads

1931 songs
Songs against capitalism
Songs based on American history
Songs written by Florence Reece
Trade union songs
Billy Bragg songs
Harlan County, Kentucky